Malsisar is a town located in Jhunjhunu district of the Indian state Rajasthan in northern India.  The village's Indian Post PIN code is 331 028. It is known for its traditional Marwari architecture and haveli.

References

Cities and towns in Jhunjhunu district